Thomas Rutledge may refer to: 

Thomas Rutledge (1817–1904), Australian politician
Thomas Lloyd Forster Rutledge (1889–1958), Australian politician
Tom Rutledge, American cable television executive

See also
Thomas Routledge (1867–1927), South African cricketer
Thomas Routledge (1819-1887), explorer, developer of bamboo as constituent of paper (replacing rags)